Calycidoris is a genus of sea slugs, dorid nudibranchs, shell-less marine gastropod molluscs in the family Calycidorididae.

Species 
Species within this genus include:
 Calycidoris guentheri Abraham, 1876

References

Onchidorididae
Taxa named by Phineas S. Abraham